Nikopol Raion (Nikopolskyi raion) is an administrative subdivision (raion) of Dnipropetrovsk Oblast, Ukraine, with the administrative center in the city of Nikopol. Population: .

On 18 July 2020, as part of the administrative reform of Ukraine, the number of raions of Dnipropetrovsk Oblast was reduced to seven, and the area of Nikopol Raion was significantly expanded. One abolished raion, Tomakivka Raion, Marhanets and Pokrov Municipalities, as well as the city of Nikopol, which was previously incorporated as a city of oblast significance and did not belong to the raion, were merged into Nikopol Raion. The January 2020 estimate of the raion population was 

The southern border of the raion is by the Kakhovka Reservoir by the Dnieper River.

Subdivisions

Current
After the reform in July 2020, the raion consisted of eight hromadas:
 Chervonohryhorivka settlement hromada with the administration in the urban-type settlement of Chervonohryhorivka, retained from Nikopol Raion;
 Marhanets urban hromada with the administration in the city of Marhanets, transferred from Marhanets Municipality;
 Myrove rural hromada with the administration in the settlement of Myrove, transferred from Tomakivka Raion;
 Nikopol urban hromada with the administration in the city of Nikopol, transferred from the city of oblast significance of Nikopol;
 Pershotravneve rural hromada with the administration in the selo of Pershotravneve, retained from Nikopol Raion;
 Pokrov urban hromada with the administration in the city of Pokrov, transferred from Pokrov Municipality;
 Pokrovske rural hromada with the administration in the selo of Pokrovske, retained from Nikopol Raion;
 Tomakivka settlement hromada with the administration in the urban-type settlement of Tomakivka, transferred from Tomakivka Raion.

Before 2020

Before the 2020 reform, the raion consisted of three hromadas:
 Chervonohryhorivka settlement hromada with the administration in  Chervonohryhorivka;
 Pershotravneve rural hromada with the administration in  Pershotravneve;
 Pokrovske rural hromada with the administration in  Pokrovske.

References

 
Zaporozhian Sich historic sites
1923 establishments in Ukraine